Mount Bear is a high, glaciated peak in the Saint Elias Mountains of Alaska. It lies within Wrangell-Saint Elias National Park, about 4 miles (6.4 km) west of the Yukon border. The Barnard Glacier flows from its southwest slopes, while the Klutlan Glacier lies to the north. Its principal claim to fame is that it is a fourteener, and in fact one of the highest 20 peaks in the United States.

Despite its height, Mount Bear is a little-visited peak, being surrounded by higher and better-known peaks such as Mount Bona on the west, and Mount Lucania and Mount Logan on the east.


See also

List of mountain peaks of North America
List of mountain peaks of the United States
List of mountain peaks of Alaska
List of the highest major summits of the United States
List of the most prominent summits of the United States

References

External links

Mount Bear on Topozone

Landforms of Copper River Census Area, Alaska
Mountains of Alaska
Mountains of Unorganized Borough, Alaska
Mount Bear
Saint Elias Mountains
Wrangell–St. Elias National Park and Preserve